Virgin River is an American romantic drama streaming television series, produced by Reel World Management, filmed in British Columbia, Canada, and based on the Virgin River novels by Robyn Carr. The first season premiered on Netflix on December 6, 2019. In September 2021, the series was renewed for a fourth and fifth season. The fourth season was released on July 20, 2022.

Premise
Virgin River follows Melinda "Mel" Monroe, who answers an ad to work as a midwife and nurse practitioner in the remote Northern California town of Virgin River, thinking it will be the perfect place to start fresh and leave her painful memories behind. But she soon discovers that small-town living isn't quite as simple as she expected.

Cast

Main

 Alexandra Breckenridge as Melinda "Mel" Monroe, a nurse practitioner and midwife who recently moved to Virgin River from Los Angeles
 Martin Henderson as Jack Sheridan, a local bar owner and former U.S. Marine, who suffers from PTSD
 Colin Lawrence as John "Preacher" Middleton, a close Marine friend of Jack, who works as the chef at Jack's Bar
 Jenny Cooper as Joey Barnes (season 1; recurring season 2–present), Mel's older sister who lives in Los Angeles
 Lauren Hammersley as Charmaine Roberts, Jack's friend with benefits
 Annette O'Toole as Hope McCrea, the mayor of Virgin River
 Tim Matheson as Vernon "Doc" Mullins, the local physician
 Benjamin Hollingsworth as Dan Brady (season 2–present; "also starring", season 1), a fellow younger veteran who served in the Marines with Jack and is struggling to readjust to civilian life
 Grayson Gurnsey as Ricky (season 2–4; recurring season 1), a young man who works at Jack's Bar and wants to join the Marines as soon as he graduates from high school
 Sarah Dugdale as Lizzie (season 2–present), Connie's troublemaking niece from Los Angeles
 Zibby Allen as Brie Sheridan (season 3–present), Jack's sister
 Marco Grazzini as Mike Valenzuela (season 3–present; recurring season 2), a Marine friend of Jack's who works as a police detective
 Mark Ghanimé as Dr. Cameron Hayek (season 4–present), the new doctor at Doc's clinic
 Kai Bradbury as Denny Cutler (season 4–present; guest season 3), Doc's grandson

Recurring
 Daniel Gillies as Mark Monroe (also starring season 1; recurring season 3; guest seasons 2, 4), Mel's late husband who is shown in flashbacks
 Lexa Doig as Paige Lassiter (seasons 1, 4; guest season 2), the owner of a bakery truck named "Paige's Bakeaway"
 Chase Petriw as Christopher Lassiter, Paige's son
 Lynda Boyd as Lilly (seasons 1–3; guest season 4), a friend of Connie and Hope
 Nicola Cavendish as Connie, one of Hope's friends who runs the town's general store and a member of Virgin River's knitting circle
 Ian Tracey as Jimmy (seasons 1–2; guest seasons 3–4), Calvin's right-hand man 
 David Cubitt as Calvin (seasons 1–2, 4; guest season 3), the man who runs the illegal pot farm on the other side of Virgin River
 Teryl Rothery as Muriel, an actress and a rival of Hope's and a member of Virgin River's knitting circle
 Gwynyth Walsh as Jo Ellen, a member of Virgin River's knitting circle who puts Mel up while her cabin is renovated
 Steve Bacic as Wes and Vince (season 2; guest seasons 3–4), Wes is Paige's estranged and abusive husband and Vince is his identical twin
 Carmel Amit as Jamie (season 2), a woman who was visiting Virgin River
 Chad Rook as Spencer (season 3; guest season 1)
 Patrick Sabongui as Todd Masry (season 3)
 Lucia Walters as Julia (seasons 3–4)
 Stacey Farber as Tara Anderson (seasons 3–present), Lilly's daughter
 Barbara Pollard as Melissa Montgomery (season 4)
 Kandyse McClure (season 5)

Episodes

Series overview

Season 1 (2019)

Season 2 (2020)

Season 3 (2021)

Season 4 (2022)

Production

Development
On September 27, 2018, it was announced that Netflix had given the production a series order for a first season consisting of ten episodes. The series was based on the Virgin River book series by Robyn Carr with executive producers: Sue Tenney, Roma Roth, and Chris Perry. Tenney was also set to serve as the series' showrunner with Reel World Management acting as the Production company involved in the series. On December 20, 2019, Netflix renewed the series for a 10-episode second season. On December 18, 2020, Netflix renewed the series for a 10-episode third season. On September 20, 2021, Netflix renewed the series for a 12-episode fourth and fifth season. On July 26 2022, it was reported that Patrick Sean Smith replaced Sue Tenney as showrunner.

Casting
On December 19, 2018, it was reported that Alexandra Breckenridge, Martin Henderson, Tim Matheson, and Annette O'Toole had been cast in series regular roles. Additionally, it was further reported that Jenny Cooper, David Cubitt, Lexa Doig, Daniel Gillies, Lauren Hammersley, Benjamin Hollingsworth, Colin Lawrence, Trevor Lerner, and Ian Tracey had joined the cast in an undisclosed capacity. On May 29, 2020, Sarah Dugdale joined the second season as a series regular while Grayson Gurnsey has been promoted as a series regular for the second season. On June 11, 2020, Benjamin Hollingsworth was promoted to a series regular for the second season. Upon the third season renewal announcement, Zibby Allen was cast a new series regular and Stacey Farber was cast in a recurring role. On October 25, 2021, Mark Ghanimé and Kai Bradbury joined cast as new series regulars for the fourth season.

Filming
Principal photography for the series' first season commenced on December 3, 2018, in Vancouver, British Columbia and ended on March 26, 2019. The series was also filmed on location in Snug Cove, New Westminster, Squamish, Agassiz, and Port Coquitlam, British Columbia. Filming for the second season began on September 9, 2019 and ended on December 17, 2019. Filming for the fourth season ended on December 7, 2021. Filming for the fifth season began on July 18 and concluded on November 21, 2022.

The community of Virgin River is actually Snug Cove, Bowen Island "with establishing shots including the local library, main streets and Artisan Lane", according to one report. The Watershed Grill, in Brackendale, British Columbia stands in for Jack's Grill; some of the scenes involving Melinda and Jack were filmed in Squamish, near the river. The waterfalls in the show is in the Shannon Falls Provincial Park. Some scenes were filmed in Burnaby at Fraser Foreshore Park and at Port Coquitlam, both near Vancouver. The cabin in the series is the caretaker’s house in Murdo Frazer Park, in North Vancouver; this site has been used by other productions as well. Doc Mullins' practice is a Victorian home in New Westminster.

Release
The first season premiered on December 6, 2019. The second season premiered on November 27, 2020. The third season was released on July 9, 2021. The fourth season premiered on July 20, 2022.

Reception

On the review aggregation website Rotten Tomatoes, the second season holds an approval rating of 90% with an average rating of 6.30/10, based on 10 critic ratings. The website's critics consensus reads, "Gentle as a babbling brook—and just as exciting, for better or worse—Virgin Rivers sophomore season offers up more of the comfort viewing that fans have come to crave." On Rotten Tomatoes, the third season has an approval rating of 56%, based on 9 critic ratings. The fourth season holds a 100% approval rating on Rotten Tomatoes, based on 7 reviews, with an average rating of 7/10.

References

External links
 
 

2010s American drama television series
2010s American romance television series
2010s romantic drama television series
2019 American television series debuts
2020s American drama television series
2020s American romance television series
2020s romantic drama television series
American romantic drama television series
English-language Netflix original programming
Television shows based on American novels
Television shows filmed in Vancouver
Television shows set in California
Works about nursing